The Monte-Carlo Pavilions, also known as the Pavillons des Merveilles and the Pavillons des Boulingrins, are five temporary commercial buildings in Monaco.

Location
The pavilions are located in the Boulingrins Gardens, near the Sporting d'Hiver and the Place du Casino.

History
The pavilions were built as temporary shops for luxury stores by the Société des Bains de Mer (SBM) for the duration of construction work along the Avenue des Beaux-Arts. The SBM invested 17 million in their construction. The construction firms were Richelmi and Acieroid, two subsidiaries of Bouygues. Construction began in 2013, and they were completed in 2014.

The pavilions were built with aluminum panels made by the firm Bertuli, and designed in the Googie style by architects Chérif Jahlan and Richard Martinet. Landscape architect Jean Mus also worked on the layout. The buildings resemble beach pebbles, with a footpath between them which looks like a river. They range "from 220 to 600 square metres each, reaching a maximum of 10 metres in height".

The tenants are Alexander Mc Queen, Akris, Balenciaga, Bottega Veneta, Boucheron, Chanel, Chopard, Czarina, Lanvin, Miu Miu, Piaget, Sonia Rykiel, Stardust, Yves Saint Laurent and Zendrini. By October 2014, two out of the five buildings were empty due to the steep rent.

The buildings are scheduled to be demolished in 2018, once the construction work on the Avenue des Beaux-Arts has ended.

References

External links
Les Pavillons des Merveilles à Monaco on YouTube

Commercial buildings in Monaco
Commercial buildings completed in 2014
Googie architecture
Buildings and structures demolished in 2018